Janis Tarchuk  is a Canadian politician. She was a member of the Legislative Assembly of Alberta, representing the constituency of Banff-Cochrane as a Progressive Conservative.

Early life

Tarchuk has a long history of community involvement. Prior to provincial politics, she chaired and sat on several local health and education boards, and served as an executive member of the Alberta School Boards Association. In addition, she was the director of Jubilee Insurance and a board member of the Alberta Educational Technology and Research Foundation.

Born and raised in Guelph, Ontario, Ms Tarchuk received her bachelor of arts degree in political science from the University of Guelph.

Political career

Tarchuk was first elected on March 11, 1997, and served four terms as the Member of the Legislative Assembly for Banff-Cochrane.

During this time, she chaired several key committees related to economic development, finance, taxation, sustainable development, and health. She also served as Minister of Children and Youth Services and Minister of Children's Services.

Currently Tarchuk is Chair of the Standing Committee on the Alberta Heritage Savings Trust Fund.

She is also on the board of Alberta Research and Innovation Authority, an Alberta Innovates advisory body that provides strategic advice and recommendations to the Government of Alberta on research opportunities, emerging technologies, and policy direction to enhance innovation.

In addition, she is a member of the Cabinet Policy Committee on Education, the Standing Committee on Education, and the Standing Committee on Privileges and Elections, Standing Orders, and Printing.

Personal life

As a resident of the Bow Valley for over 30 years, her personal interests include skiing, hiking, reading and the many local cultural opportunities.
Tarchuk and her husband Byron live in Banff and have two grown children.

Election results

References
http://www.assembly.ab.ca/net/index.aspx?p=mla_bio&rnumber=45

Progressive Conservative Association of Alberta MLAs
Women MLAs in Alberta
Year of birth missing (living people)
Living people
People from Banff, Alberta
People from Guelph
Members of the Executive Council of Alberta
21st-century Canadian politicians
21st-century Canadian women politicians
Women government ministers of Canada